Ngawang Wangyal, aka Sogpo (Mongolian) Wangyal, popularly known as Geshe Wangyal and "America's first lama," was a Buddhist lama and scholar of Kalmyk origin.  He was born in the Astrakhan province in southeast Russia sometime in 1901 and died in West Palm Beach, Florida in 1983. He came to the United States from Tibet in 1955 and was the spiritual leader of the Kalmuk Buddhist community in Freewood Acres, New Jersey (near Freehold) at the Rashi Gempil-Ling Buddhist Temple.   He is considered a "founding figure" of Buddhism in the West.

He developed the code for the CIA that aided the Dalai Lama's escape from Tibet, spearheaded a two decade long undertaking to lift political proscriptions on US visits by the 14th Dalai Lama, opened the first Tibetan Buddhist Dharma center in the West, and trained the first generation of Tibetan Buddhist scholars in America. He taught at Columbia University and sponsored visits by monks and lamas from the Tibetan emigre settlement in India, instructing them in English so they could serve the Buddhist community in the United States.

In 1971 Geshe Wangyal and the Dalai Lama persuaded Robert Thurman to start publishing an English translation of the entire 4000 titles of the Tengyur, "the Tibetan canon of scientific treatises (śāstra), which constitutes Indo-Tibetan civilization's contribution to the contemporary arts and sciences." In 1972, the American Institute of Buddhist Studies was founded at Columbia University as suggested by the Dalai Lama and Geshe Wangyal. The published translations, Treasury of Buddhist Sciences: The Translated Scriptures & Treatises, are the founding series of The American Institute of Buddhist Studies at Columbia University.

Wangyal translated two volumes of popular Tibetan and Sanskrit stories illustrative of Buddhist teachings, The Door of Liberation and The Prince Who Became a Cuckoo. With Brian Cutillo, he also translated the "Illuminations of Sakya-Pandita."

The Dalai Lama thanked 
 in a message of congratulations and thanks to those who started Tibet House in New York, in a video opening 2021's 34th annual Tibet House US benefit.

Early years 
Geshe Wangyal, the youngest of four children, chose to enter the monastery as a novice monk at age six. After the Russian Civil War, Geshe Wangyal went to Lhasa, Tibet, where he studied at the Gomang College of Drepung Monastic University in Lhasa until 1935 when he decided to return to his homeland to obtain financial support to complete his studies.

Due to Communist persecution of religious clergy, Geshe Wangyal decided to end his return trip home. Instead, he found a job in Peking, China, comparing different editions of the Tibetan collections of Buddha's word (Kangyur) and of the treatises of Indian commentators (Tanjur). In 1937, Geshe Wangyal left Peking to return to Tibet via India after earning enough money to support himself until he received his geshe degree from Drepung.

While in Calcutta, Geshe Wangyal was hired as a translator to Sir Charles Bell, a well-known British statesman, scholar and explorer, and accompanied him on a trip through China and Manchuria before returning to Tibet. Afterwards, he received his geshe degree in Lhasa and used his remaining earnings and many newly established contacts to raise funds for the purpose of assisting poor scholars to obtain their geshe degree, especially Mongolians in India, who, like him, were cut off from support from a Communist home country.

When the Communist Chinese invaded Tibet in the early 1950s, Geshe Wangyal escaped to India. Then in 1955, he was sent to the United States by the Dalai Lama to work as a lama among the Kalmyk Americans who were newly resettled in New Jersey, New York and Pennsylvania as refugees from Central Europe.

Buddhist monastery's teacher 
In 1958, Geshe Wangyal established and built the first Tibetan Buddhist dharma center in the West, Labsum Shedrub Ling, the Lamaist Buddhist Monastery of America, renamed the Tibetan Buddhist Learning Center, in Washington, New Jersey.  Geshe Wangyal, leader of New Jersey's 400‐member Kalmuk Mongolian community, was in charge of the arrangements for the Dalai Lama's visit to the state in September 1979. In 1971, he had a room built and reserved for the Dalai Lama at Labsum Shedrub Ling, and it was in that room that the Dalai Lama stayed after greeting his followers.  He served as the monastery's head teacher until his death in January, 1983. He taught many students of Western background and contributed greatly to the spread of Tibetan Buddhism in the United States.

Among his students were translators, scholars, authors, artists, doctors and teachers including Dr. Robert Thurman, Professor of Indo-Tibetan Buddhist Studies at Columbia University and president of Tibet House US, who was introduced to the Dalai Lama by Geshe Wangyal, Thurman's first guru; Dr. Jeffrey Hopkins, Professor Emeritus University of Virginia, Dr. Alexander Berzin; scholar Joshua Cutler and Diana Cutler, Directors of the Tibetan Buddhist Learning Center; painter, teacher and author Ted Seth Jacobs, composer and musician Philip Glass, and Dr. Daniel P. Brown, Ph.D, Professor of Harvard Medical School and author. According to Dr. Berzin,

Selected Bibliography
 The Door of Liberation: Essential Teachings of the Tibetan Buddhist Tradition, Wisdom Publications, January 1, 2002  
 The Jewelled Staircase, Snow Lion, January 1, 1990, 
 The Prince Who Became a Cuckoo: A Tale of liberation (The Bhaisajaguru series), Lama Lo-dro of Drepung, author; Lama Geshe Wangyal, translator; Theatre Arts Books; January 1, 1982, 
 Illuminations of Sakya-Pandita: A Guide to Essential Buddhist Practices,  Geshe Wangyal, translator with Brian Cutillo, Wisdom Publications; May 1, 1988,

References

1901 births
1983 deaths
Buddhism in Kalmykia
Kalmyk people
Geshes
Lamas
Tibetan Buddhists from the United States
Tibetan Buddhists from the Russian Empire
Soviet emigrants to India
American people of Kalmyk descent
Gelug Lamas